Markus Johannesson (born 29 May 1975) is a Swedish former football defender and football commentator.

Career 
Johannesson started his career at Rölanda IF, but moved on to Eds FF and IK Oddevold before he was signed by Örgryte IS in 1997. In 2004, Johannesson left Örgryte IS for Djurgårdens IF. He won The Double with Djurgården in 2005 and was also the captain of the team. He has been capped five times and scored one goal for the Sweden national football team. He was later on the 2009 season on the bench for Kebba Ceesay. But later on he took back his place but then as a defensive midfielder where he used to play with Örgryte IS. Johannesson scored his first league goal for Djurgården in his last game against Kalmar FF, helping Djurgården to reach relegation round against Assyriska FF. Djurgården lost the first game away 0–2 but won at home in extra time, 3–0.

Johannesson retired from professional football after the 2009 season.

Since 2010, Johannesson works for SVT as football commentator.

Career statistics

International 

Scores and results list Sweden's goal tally first, score column indicates score after each Johannesson goal.

Honours 

 Djurgårdens IF 
 Allsvenskan: 2005
 Svenska Cupen : 2004, 2005
Individual
 Årets Järnkamin: 2009

References

External links
 
 

1975 births
Living people
Allsvenskan players
Djurgårdens IF Fotboll players
Örgryte IS players
Swedish footballers
Sweden international footballers
Sweden under-21 international footballers
Association football defenders
IK Oddevold players
Swedish association football commentators